Doum may refer to:

Doum, Central African Republic
Doum Doum, Chad
Hyphaene thebaica or doum palm, a type of palm tree

See also
Douma (disambiguation)